The 2022–23 Utah State Aggies men's basketball team represented Utah State University in the Mountain West Conference during the 2022–23 NCAA Division I men's basketball season. Led by second-year head coach Ryan Odom, the Aggies played their home games on campus at the Smith Spectrum in Logan, Utah.

Utah State finished the regular season at 24–7 (13–5 in Mountain West, second). In the conference tournament, they defeated New Mexico and Boise State, then lost to San Diego State in the final. The Aggies received an at-large bid to the NCAA tournament and were seeded tenth in the South region; they were defeated by seventh seed Missouri in the first round at Sacramento and finished at 26–9.

Previous season
The Aggies finished the 2021–22 season at 18–16 (8–10 in Mountain West, seventh). In the conference tournament, they defeated Air Force in the first round, then lost to Colorado State in the quarterfinals. Utah State received an at-large bid to the National Invitation Tournament, but lost to Oregon in the first round.

Offseason

Departures

Incoming transfers

Recruiting classes

2022 recruiting class 
There were no incoming recruits for the class of 2022.

2023 recruiting class

Roster

Schedule and results

|-
!colspan=9 style=| Non-conference regular season

|-
!colspan=9 style=| Mountain West regular season

|-
!colspan=9 style=| Mountain West tournament

|-
!colspan=12 style=""| NCAA Tournament

Source

References 

Utah State
Utah State Aggies men's basketball seasons
Utah State Aggies Men's Basketball
Utah State Aggies Men's Basketball
Utah State